Saudades is the name of the debut double-disc album released by Trio Beyond in 2006 on ECM records.  Saudades is a Portuguese word meaning sadness or longing for times past, or in a musical context, blues.

Reception

The AllMusic review by Thom Jurek awarded the album 4½ stars, stating, "Jack DeJohnette initiated a project to pay tribute to the late Tony Williams' Lifetime... The results on this double-disc album, Saudades, are explosive, dynamic, and utterly compelling... This is one of the finer moments in recent ECM history, and a fitting tribute to Williams and his contribution to a music that sharply divided "purists' (who still are a pain in the ass in trying to preserve jazz as a museum piece), and those more progressive thinking fans who were -- and are still -- looking for a music that could breathe, engage the culture, and continue to grow". A JazzTimes reviewer selected it in 2012 as one of DeJohnette's key albums, and wrote that it "might be his most incendiary showcase of sheer drumming prowess".

Track listing 
Disc One:
"If" (Joe Henderson) - 10:07
"As One" (Larry Goldings) - 4:36
"Allah Be Praised" (Larry Young) - 0:43
"Saudades" (Jack DeJohnette, John Scofield, Larry Goldings) - 10:46
"Pee Wee" (Tony Williams) - 12:13
"Spectrum" (John McLaughlin) - 16:11
Disc Two:
"Seven Steps To Heaven" (Miles Davis, Victor Feldman) - 12:54
"I Fall in Love Too Easily" (Jule Styne, Sammy Cahn) - 10:13
"Love In Blues" (DeJohnette, Goldings, Scofield) - 4:45
"Big Nick" (John Coltrane) - 17:08
"Emergency" (Williams) - 11:19

Track information and structure

"If"
"If" is a 12 bar blues composed by Joe Henderson.  The band takes this number at around 180 bpm.
The head is played twice.  John Scofield then plays a guitar solo for 13 choruses, 156 bars.  Larry Goldings takes a solo which lasts for 10 choruses.  The group then exchange solos for one chorus each, in the following sequence:  Scofield, DeJohnette, Goldings, DeJohnette, Scofield, DeJohnette.  The exchange of solos continues, then with each player taking just four bars.  The sequence is essentially the same (guitar and organ solos alternating, interspersed with drums) but starts with the organ instead of guitar. This 16-bar long pattern repeats three times (48 bars), which of course equates to four choruses.  The song is ended with two more repeats of the head.  Total song length: 444 bars, at 180 bmp should be 9 mins 52 seconds long. Extra time due to audience and slight (only by 1 or 2 bpm) slowing of tempo.

"As One"

"As One" has a much freer structure. Larry Goldings is credited with its creation, though one suspects this is a largely spontaneous composition. The first two minutes of the song are an organ solo, in which the mood of the whole song is dictated. Drums and Guitar then join in the fun, but the style remains free. The song grows in intensity to the end, where it leads cleverly into "Allah Be Praised"

"Allah Be Praised"

This number is a Larry Young (organist in The Tony Williams Lifetime trio) composition. The song is another 12 bar blues, but in this rendition, the second repeat of the head is largely free of regular pulse. At only 43 seconds long, this track is really employed as a lead-in to the next, and title, track, "Saudades".

"Saudades"

This track, the second song over 10 minutes on this album (10 mins 46 secs), is an extremely funky number - taken at about 82 beats per minute. The song largely features John Scofield playing funky effects and runs on his guitar. The effects added by Goldings add further to the incredible energy of this song.

After about 7 minutes of Scofield's effects, Goldings takes over and plays around with some inventive and witty digital samplings. Goldings plays a brilliant bassline on the organ to accompany his adventures.

"Pee Wee"

At the start of this song, Jack DeJohnette says that this Tony Williams composition is taken from the 1965 Miles Davis album E.S.P.. This is, in fact, not correct; the song is taken from Sorcerer (1967).

The song starts with a -minute solo guitar introduction before drums and organ join in. Goldings takes an organ solo after the opening guitar section, which is then followed by another guitar solo (this time more structured) from Scofield.

References 

Jack DeJohnette live albums
Collaborative albums
2006 live albums
John Scofield live albums
ECM Records live albums